Gratteri (Sicilian: Ratteri) is a comune (municipality) in the Metropolitan City of Palermo in the Italian region Sicily, located about  southeast of Palermo.

Gratteri borders the following municipalities: Cefalù, Collesano, Isnello, Lascari.

Demographic evolution

References

External links 
 Portal and Community of Gratteri municipality
 Gratteri's church
 Football-Team U.S. Gratterese 
 Musical association Vincenzo Bellini - Gratteri

External links
 Portal and community in the municipality of Gratteri
 Church of Gratteri
 La pagina web dedicata alla U.S Gratterese Calcio
 Municipality of Gratteri
 Cultural association musical of Gratteri

Municipalities of the Metropolitan City of Palermo